The 1864 Town of New Plymouth by-election was a by-election held  on 18 November 1864 in the  electorate during the 3rd New Zealand Parliament.

The by-election was caused by the resignation of the incumbent, Henry Hanson Turton on 21 October 1864.

He was replaced by Charles Brown.  Brown was the only nomination, so was declared elected unopposed.

References 

New Plymouth 1864
1864 elections in New Zealand
November 1864 events
Politics of Taranaki